Danielle Lee or simply Danes Lee (born October 24, 1987) is a Filipina actress.

Personal life and acting career 
Danes Lee or Danielle Lee is the younger sister of model and TV personality Divine Lee. She started out with TV5, where she was launched as one of the leads in the aborted local version of the Hollywood hit series “Pretty Little Liars.”

After the series was shelved, Danes decided to focus on her studies although she continued to accept modeling gigs from time to time. With her towering and leggy frame, not a few people see her as beauty queen material. Although very close to her sister, Danes is determined to make a name for herself in the acting field.

Filmography 
Television

References 
 Meet the newest GMA Artist Center talents, David Licauco and Danes Lee! Retrieved 2017-06-14
 Danes Lee and David Licauco is now proudly a member of the GMA Artist Center family! Retrieved 2017-06-14

Living people
1991 births